Vinícius de Souza Costa (born 19 June 1999) is a Brazilian professional footballer who plays as a defensive midfielder for La Liga club Espanyol, on loan from Lommel.

Career

Early career
Born and raised in Padre Miguel, neighborhood of Rio de Janeiro, Vinícius arrived at Flamengo in 2014 to play in the club's under 15 team approved by coach Zé Ricardo. In the youth team he played alongside Matheus Thuler and Lincoln, future teammates in the professional team.

Flamengo
On 9 March 2019 Vinícius debuted on the professional team playing in the final minutes of a Campeonato Carioca 1–1 draw against Vasco da Gama at Maracanã Stadium.

After the transfer of Gustavo Cuéllar to Al-Hilal on August 2019 head coach Jorge Jesus promoted Vinícius to the professional team. The Portuguese coach praised him very much comparing him to his former player Nemanja Matić.

On 10 October 2019 Vinícius played his first Campeonato Brasileiro Série A against Atlético Mineiro at Maracanã Stadium replacing Reinier in the injury time, Flamengo won 3–1.

Lommel
On 25 August 2020, Lommel signed Vinícius from Flamengo for a fee of €2.5million.

Mechelen (loan)
On 1 July 2021, Vinícius joined K.V. Mechelen on a season-long loan.

Espanyol (loan)
On 8 July 2022, Vinícius joined Espanyol on a season-long loan.

Career statistics

Club

Notes

Honours

Clubs
Flamengo
Copa Libertadores: 2019
Recopa Sudamericana: 2020
Campeonato Brasileiro Série A: 2019
Supercopa do Brasil: 2020
Campeonato Carioca: 2019, 2020

References

1999 births
Living people
Brazilian footballers
Footballers from Rio de Janeiro (city)
Association football midfielders
Campeonato Brasileiro Série A players
Challenger Pro League players
Belgian Pro League players
La Liga players
CR Flamengo footballers
Lommel S.K. players
K.V. Mechelen players
RCD Espanyol footballers
Brazil under-20 international footballers
Brazil youth international footballers
Brazilian expatriate footballers
Brazilian expatriate sportspeople in Belgium
Brazilian expatriate sportspeople in Spain
Expatriate footballers in Belgium
Expatriate footballers in Spain